Muhlenbergia porteri is a species of grass known by the common names bush muhly and Porter's muhly.

Distribution
The bunchgrass is native to North America, where it can be found throughout the south-western United States, from the southern Great Basin and Four Corners region to the northern Mexican Plateau and Baja California Peninsula. Specifically, Muhlenbergii porteri naturally occurs in ecoregions including the California deserts, the Great Plains from far southern Colorado into western Texas, and the Chihuahuan Desert.

Description
Muhlenbergia porteri is a perennial bunchgrass producing wiry, knotted stems up to about 80 centimeters tall. The inflorescence is an open array of spreading, thread-thin branches bearing small, awned spikelets. The bloom period is May and June.

The species was named for Thomas Conrad Porter.

References

External links
Calflora Database: Muhlenbergia porteri (Bush muhly,  Porter's muhly)
Jepson Manual eFlora (TJM2) treatment of Muhlenbergia porteri
USDA Plants Profile; Muhlenbergia porteri (bush muhly)
Grass Manual Treatment of Muhlenbergia porteri
UC CalPhotos gallery of Muhlenbergia porteri

porteri
Bunchgrasses of North America
Grasses of Mexico
Grasses of the United States
Flora of Northeastern Mexico
Flora of Northwestern Mexico
Flora of the Southwestern United States
Flora of the South-Central United States
Flora of the California desert regions
Flora of the Chihuahuan Desert
Flora of the Great Basin
Native grasses of California
Native grasses of Oklahoma
Native grasses of Texas
Natural history of the Colorado Desert
Natural history of the Mojave Desert
Flora of the Mexican Plateau
Natural history of the Peninsular Ranges
Flora without expected TNC conservation status